La Corey is a hamlet in central Alberta, Canada within the Municipal District of Bonnyville No. 87, located on Highway 55 approximately  west of Cold Lake.

Demographics 
In 2014, the population of La Corey according to the 2014 municipal census conducted by the Municipal District of Bonnyville No. 87 was 59.

See also 
List of communities in Alberta
List of hamlets in Alberta

References 

Municipal District of Bonnyville No. 87
Hamlets in Alberta